Parliamentary elections were held in Norway in 1900. The result was a victory for the Liberal Party, which received 54% of the vote and won 79 of the 114 seats in the Storting. No party has received a majority of the vote in a Norwegian election since.

Results

References

General elections in Norway
1900s elections in Norway
Norway
Parliamentary